World of Sport was an Australian sports program that was broadcast live by HSV-7 in Melbourne from 1959 to 1987 on Sundays between 11am and 2pm. By the end of its run, the show was claimed as the world's longest running sports program.

History
A unique combination of talk, banter, highly informed commentary, invented and real sports, the program held a unique place in the sports-obsessed culture of Melbourne and made stars out of a number of ex-sportsman, particularly Australian rules footballers.

The show premiered on Saturday 16 May 1959, less than three years after the debut of television in Australia.

Sponsored by Westinghouse (a white goods manufacturer) it ran for two hours and was hosted by radio commentator Ron Casey. The sponsor turned down an opportunity to renew after a thirteen-week run, but Casey saw the opportunity inherent in the concept and enlisted the help of another well known radio presenter, "Uncle Doug" Elliott.

The duo bought the concept, purchased air time on a Sunday and enlisted a new sponsor, Vealls, for 1960.

Appearing on the show with Ron Casey were racing journalist Jack Elliott, professional footrunner Mike Williamson, Publican and footballer Ted Rippon, boxing journalist Merv Williams, footballer and journalist Kevin Coghlan, broadcaster and member of the Victorian Legislative Assembly 1960–1979 Doug Elliott, Victorian policeman and champion axeman Jack O'Toole, Geelong footballing champion Bob Davis, triple Brownlow medallist Bob Skilton, Collingwood Goalkicking Legend Gordon Coventry, actor, boxer and international boxing referee Gus Mercurio (also the father of Paul Mercurio), singer and racecaller "The Accurate One" Bill Collins, racing journalist Rollo Roylance, Brownlow Medallist Neil Roberts,  boxer and sports reporter and football commentator Peter Landy. One of the delights was seeing Bruce Andrew, "whose hair was parted so emphatically down the centre that it was claimed he used a theodolite" (Ross, 1996, p220), judging the short and long kicking contests.

Dyer in particular was known for some of his legendary one-liners, or "Dyerisms", such as:
"He's tuckled strongly by Tack." (referring to Michael Tuck)
"He sets himself for a high mark – actually, that was a low high mark"
"Bamblett made a great debut last week, and an even better one today."

The show also featured woodchopping contests, contest involving sand and blue-metal shovelling, sheaf tossing, track-cycle sprint-racing on rollers (with world champion cyclist Sid Patterson taking on all comers), and a game of indoor football invented specifically for that show in that particular studio space. The show was also famous for having champion VFL footballers of the day appearing on the show to contest the Handball Competition, and receive prizes such as meat pies and hairdriers.

A group involved in the Melbourne-based post-punk little band scene of the 1980s named themselves after the show.

See also
World of Sport (Sydney, Australia TV series)

Footnotes

References
 Ross, J. (ed), 100 Years of Australian Football 1897–1996: The Complete Story of the AFL, All the Big Stories, All the Great Pictures, All the Champions, Every AFL Season Reported, Viking, (Ringwood), 1996.  (especially Gordon, H., "When showbiz came to football", p. 220)

Australian sports television series
Seven Network original programming
1959 Australian television series debuts
1987 Australian television series endings
1960s Australian television series
1970s Australian television series
Black-and-white Australian television shows
History of Australian rules football